Gregynog Young Musicians Competition began in 2005, originally as part of the Gregynog Festival, and more recently as a free-standing event.  It is held at Gregynog Hall in Mid Wales and is open to instrumentalists aged 18 and under.

Winners have been:

Category Winners
In 2013, the structure of the competition was changed and 5 separate categories were introduced; 'Gregynog Young String Player of the Year', 'Gregynog Young Pianist of the Year', 'Gregynog Young Woodwind Player of the Year', 'Gregynog Young Brass Player' and 'Gregynog Young Harpist / Guitarist / Percussionist of the Year'.  The 'Young Accompanist Prize' was also instituted for accompanists aged 23 and under. The competition rules allow joint winners in a single category should a winner not be identified in another category.

Category winners have been:

*Overall Winner

References

Music competitions in the United Kingdom